Quest Arabiya was a free-to-air pan-Arab television channel. The channel was launched on 7 December 2015 across the Middle East and North Africa region. It was the region's localized version of the Quest channel. The channel was owned  by Discovery Communications in partnership with the Abu Dhabi-based Image Nation.

Focusing primarily on factual and reality-based programming, Quest Arabiya broadcast for 24 hours a day and was expected to reach an estimated 45 million households across 22 countries. The channel was targeted toward a wide demographic of Arabic-speaking males and females while specifically targeting males 16+ at key times in the schedule.

Content from Discovery's library of factual entertainment shows have been voice-over translated into Arabic. Soon afterward, an English track was launched, allowing viewers to watch the programs in their original language without voice-over translation into Arabic.

On 24 April 2019, the channel announced on their Facebook page that the channel will cease broadcasting on 1 May 2019 without giving a reason.

The channel ceased operations on 1 May 2019.

Programming 
 American Chopper
 Animal's Guide to Survival
 Back to the Village
 Build It Bigger
 Chop Shop: London Garage
 Destroyed in Seconds
 Dual Survival
 Everest: Beyond the Limit
 How It's Made
 I (Almost) Got Away with It
 Into Alaska with Jeff Corwin
 Lone Target
 My Cat from Hell
 New York: Inside Out
 NextWorld
 Off the Hook: Extreme Catches
 The Pop Illusionist
 Ultimate Survival
 Wheeler Dealers: Trading Up
 Yukon Men

External links
  

Arabic-language television stations
Warner Bros. Discovery networks
Defunct television channels
Mass media in Abu Dhabi
Television channels and stations established in 2015
Television channels and stations disestablished in 2019
Television stations in the United Arab Emirates